Basketball Löwen Braunschweig is a basketball club based in Braunschweig, Germany. The club currently plays in the Basketball Bundesliga, the top tier of German basketball. The club's home arena is Volkswagen Halle. Founded in 2001 as Metabox Braunschweig, the club was established as the separated professional team of SG Braunschweig.

History
The team was formed as a new company in 2000, taking over the Bundesliga license of SG Braunschweig. The newly formed team was named Metabox Braunschweig.

However, the new name sponsor (Metabox) had to abandon the project after only a couple of months, due to insufficient financial means. Fortunately, the club was saved by the communal sports association and from 2001 up to the end of the 2001–2002 season, it lived on under a new name: StadtSport Braunschweig. In the season 2002–2003, the team played under the new name TXU Energie Braunschweig. In the 2003–2004, the club again was renamed BS Energy Braunschweig. At the end of the 2005 – 2006 season Braunschweig finished the season at the bottom of the table, which usually leads to a team being relegated to the second highest German Basketball League,  ProA. Fortunately, the Basketball Bundesliga (Germany's top basketball league) had just committed to expanding the number of teams, so there were two extra wild card slots that could be purchased for an amount of 100.000 Euro. The club's financial resources, however, were rather scarce, due to the lack of success in the previous seasons. Therefore, team was only able to afford the license, because of the help of three sponsors (BS Energy, Öffentliche Braunschweig, Volkswagen Sport Förderung). BS Energy relinquished the right to name the club, but did not reduce the financial support, neither did the other two sponsors.

In the 2006–2007 season, New Yorker, a clothing company from Braunschweig, acquired the naming rights. They narrowed their ideas for a new name down to three options and let the fans vote for a new name for the club. 78% of the fans voted for the name New Yorker Phantoms Braunschweig, a potentially confusing name for the brand that could be mistaken for a team from New York.
In the 2009–2010 season, the team reached the 8th seed and the playoffs for the first time in 7 years. After beating the No.1 seed in the quarter finals 3:1, they were swept 3:0 by the Brose Baskets, who went on to win both, the championship and the midseason tournament, the German Cup.

In the Season 2010–2011 the team reached the final-four tournament of the BBL-Pokal , after beating the league rival EWE Baskets Oldenburg 88:76 in the previous round. 
In the 2011– 2012 season, the Phantoms were able to reach the semi-finals of the league cup (BBL-Pokal) again, but lost to Telekom Baskets Bonn. They finished the regular season as a 7th seed, but were swept by ratiopharm Ulm in the first round of the Playoffs. During the season, the then coach Sebastian Machowski had already announced his resignation for the end of the season. He joined EWE Baskets Oldenburg and was replaced by the Greek coach Kostas Flevarakis.

In the 2011–2012 season, the team was not able to match the performance of the previous seasons. They found themselves at the bottom of the table for the entire season, but were able to escape relegation on the penultimate match day of the season, when they were able to beat the Walter Tigers Tübingen on the road. The biggest positive of that season was the emergence of Dennis Schröder in Braunschweig. His individual performances lead to him being named not only the “best german youth player 2013”, but also the “most improved player 2013”. However, head coach Flevarakis was let go after the season. 
In the 2013–14 season, Raoul Korner became the new Phantoms coach. He had previously been coaching the Dutch team Eiffel Towers Den Bosch. The phantoms finished that season as an 8th seed.

Before the beginning of the 2014–2015 season, the name sponsor New Yorker announced that they were not going to extend their commitment with Braunschweig's basketball team. After that, the team was renamed Basketball Löwen Braunschweig., the new team colors being blue and yellow (previously white/red). 
After the end of the 2015–2016 season, head coach Raoul Korner left the Basketball Löwen and joined Medi Bayreuth, a German rival. Frank Menz, became his successor. 
Assembling a roster for the 2016–2017 was rather problematic, due to the lack of funds. So the team went into the season with low expectations that were proven adequate, after they finished the season with merely six wins, which should have led to them being relegated to the 2nd highest German basketball league, ProA. But, since the league rival Phoenix Hagen had to file for bankruptcy, an additional spot in Germany's first league became available for the Basketball Löwen. 

In February 2018, the then established NBA player Dennis Schröder who was born and raised in Braunschweig, indicated interest to become a shareholder of the team and vowed to lead them into the top five of Germany. In March of the same year, it was officially announced that Schröder would become a shareholder/partner of the operating company that ran the team. Since the season 2018–19, Dennis Schröder has been the majority shareholder of the Basketball Löwen Braunschweig. In that season the team was able to reach the playoffs as the 8th seed but were swept 0:3 by Bayern Munich.

Despite the first playoff berth since the 2011–2012 season, the head coach Frank Menz left the Basketball Löwen after three seasons. The Austrian-American Coach Peter Strobl was then hired to coach the team in the 2019–2020 season.

On 1 July 2020, NBA player Dennis Schröder became the sole owner of Braunschweig after purchasing the remaining 30% of shares. On 24 August 2020, the club revealed its new logo and club colours black and gold.

Sponsorship names

Partly due to sponsorship reasons, the club has been known under several names:
Basketball Löwen Braunschweig (2014–present)
BS Energy Braunschweig (2003–2006)
Metabox Braunschweig (2000–2001)
New Yorker Phantoms Braunschweig (2006–2014)
StadtSport Braunschweig (2001–2002)
TXU Energie Braunschweig (2002–2003)

Club identity

The logo of the club features a lion.

Arena

The Löwen's home games take place at the 3,603 seat Volkswagen Halle, which opened in 2000. The team's predecessor SG Braunschweig had previously hosted its games at the 1,500 seat Sporthalle Alte Waage.

Farm team
From 2000 to 2015, SG Braunschweig, playing in the 2. Basketball Bundesliga respectively ProB, served as the club's farm team. In 2015, SG Braunschweig entered into a cooperation with MTV Herzöge Wolfenbüttel. Starting with the 2015–16 ProB season, both clubs will field a joint team which will play in Wolfenbüttel and serve as a farm team for the Basketball Löwen Braunschweig.

Team

Current roster

Notable players

  Aaron Doornekamp
  Branko Jorović
  Chris Herren
  Daniel Theis
  Demond Mallet
  Dennis Schröder
  Eric Boateng
  Heiko Schaffartzik
  Igors Miglinieks
  Jermaine Anderson
  John Allen
  John Celestand
  LaMarr Greer
  Luboš Bartoň
  Marcus Goree
  Michael Umeh
  Milko Bjelica
  Nils Mittmann
  Peter Fehse
  Rich Melzer
  Steve Goodrich
  Szymon Szewczyk
  Terrell McIntyre
  Tony Skinn

Notable coaches
  Emir Mutapčić
  Henrik Dettmann
  Kostas Flevarakis
  Sebastian Machowski

Season by season

 Braunschweig was spared relegation due to the expansion of the Basketball Bundesliga from 16 to 18 teams for the 2006–07 season.

References

Notes

External links

 
Basketball teams established in 2000
Sport in Braunschweig
Basketball clubs in Lower Saxony
Organisations based in Braunschweig
2000 establishments in Germany